The Oklahoma City Thunder is a professional American basketball franchise based in Oklahoma City, Oklahoma. It plays in the Northwest Division of the Western Conference in the National Basketball Association (NBA). The franchise was the Seattle SuperSonics from 1967 to 2008 until relocated to Oklahoma City. The team plays its home games at the Chesapeake Energy Arena. The Thunder is owned by Professional Basketball Club LLC and coached by Billy Donovan, with Sam Presti as its General Manager. All records and achievements shown have been accomplished in Oklahoma City.

This is a list of the accomplishments and records of the Oklahoma City Thunder following their move from Seattle, Washington where they were known as the Seattle SuperSonics. For the SuperSonics accomplishments and records see Seattle SuperSonics Records.

Individual records

Franchise leaders 
Bold denotes still active with team.

Italic denotes still active but not with team.

All records and achievements have been accomplished as The Oklahoma City Thunder

Points scored (regular season)

(as of the middle of the 2022-23 season)
 Russell Westbrook (18,859)
 Kevin Durant (15,942)
 Serge Ibaka (6,054)
 Shai Gilgeous-Alexander (5,376)
 Steven Adams (5,191)
 Paul George (3,893)
 Jeff Green (3,273)
 Nick Collison (2,846)
 James Harden (2,795)
 Luguentz Dort (2,728)
 Enes Kanter Freedom (2,556)
 Dennis Schröder (2,453)
 Thabo Sefolosha (2,284)
 Reggie Jackson (2,202)
 Jerami Grant (2,193)
 Darius Bazley (2,037)
 Josh Giddey (1,725)
 Nenad Krstic (1,441)
 Anthony Morrow (1,400)
 André Roberson (1,376)

Other statistics (regular season) 
(As of the middle of the 2022–23 season)

Single Game Records

Most points scored in a game
(Correct as of the end of the 2018–19 season)

Award winners
(Correct as of the end of the 2019–20 season)

NBA MVP Award
Kevin Durant – 2014
Russell Westbrook – 2017

NBA Scoring Champion
Kevin Durant – 2009–2010 (30.1 PPG)
Kevin Durant – 2010–2011 (27.7 PPG)
Kevin Durant – 2011–2012 (28.0 PPG)
Kevin Durant – 2013–2014 (32.0 PPG)
Russell Westbrook – 2014–2015 (28.1 PPG)
Russell Westbrook - 2016–2017 (31.6 PPG)

NBA Assists Leader
Russell Westbrook – 2017–2018 (10.3 APG)
Russell Westbrook – 2018–2019 (10.7 APG)

NBA Blocks Leader
Serge Ibaka – 2011–2012 (3.6 BPG)
Serge Ibaka – 2012–2013 (3.03 BPG)

NBA Coach of the Year Award
Scott Brooks – 2010

NBA Sixth Man of the Year Award
James Harden – 2012

NBA Community Assist Award
Russell Westbrook – 2015

All-NBA First Team
Kevin Durant – 2010, 2011, 2012, 2013, 2014
Russell Westbrook – 2016, 2017
Paul George – 2019

All-NBA Second Team
Russell Westbrook – 2011, 2012, 2013, 2015, 2018
Kevin Durant – 2016
Chris Paul – 2020

All-NBA Third Team
Russell Westbrook – 2019

NBA All-Defensive First Team
Serge Ibaka – 2012, 2013, 2014
Paul George – 2019

NBA All-Defensive Second Team
Thabo Sefolosha – 2010
Andre Roberson – 2017

NBA All-Rookie First Team
Russell Westbrook – 2009

NBA All-Rookie Second Team
James Harden – 2010 
Steven Adams – 2014
Josh Giddey – 2022

NBA All-Star Team
Kevin Durant – 2010-2016
Russell Westbrook – 2011-2013, 2015-2019
Paul George – 2018-2019
Chris Paul - 2020
Shai Gilgeous-Alexander - 2023

NBA All-Star Game Most Valuable Player Award
Kevin Durant – 2012
Russell Westbrook – 2015-2016

NBA All-Star head coach
Scott Brooks – 2012, 2014

Slam Dunk Champion
Hamidou Diallo - 2019

Rising Stars Challenge MVP
Kevin Durant – 2009

Rising Stars Challenge Team
Kevin Durant – 2009
Jeff Green – 2009
Russell Westbrook – 2009, 2010
James Harden – 2010, 2011
Serge Ibaka – 2011
Steven Adams – 2014, 2015
Alex Abrines – 2017
Domantas Sabonis – 2017
Shai Gilgeous-Alexander – 2020
Luguentz Dort – 2021
Théo Maledon – 2021
Josh Giddey – 2022, 2023
Jalen Williams – 2023

References

records
National Basketball Association accomplishments and records by team